The English Bowls Association was the governing body of bowls in England until 2007. From 2008 onwards, Bowls England was formed, which now runs the sport. The English National Bowls Championships for bowls are held annually, where either 1, 2 or 3 representatives from each county compete for the national titles.

Bowls England was inaugurated after two associations unified to form it, the English Bowling Association (EBA) and the English Women's Bowling Association (EWBA). The events are categorised into national championships and national competitions; below are the men's national championships.

Men's national championships

Men's singles champions (four wood)

Men's singles champions (two wood)

Men's pairs champions

Men's triples champions

Men's fours champions

Men's junior singles champions

Men's junior pairs champions

See also
Women's National Championships
Men's National Competitions
Women's National Competitions
Mixed National Competitions

References

Bowls in England